Gregory Davis (born 2 August 1966) is a Trinidadian cricketer. He played in one first-class match for Trinidad and Tobago in 1990/91.

See also
 List of Trinidadian representative cricketers

References

External links
 

1966 births
Living people
Trinidad and Tobago cricketers